This Bliss is the second studio album by German electronic music producer Pantha du Prince. It was released on 29 January 2007 by Dial Records.

Two of the album's tracks, "Urlichten" and "Walden 2", had been released prior to the album on the "Lichten"/"Walden" 12" single.

Critical reception

The New York Times critic Jon Caramanica described This Bliss as Pantha du Prince's "high-water mark", "a pensive, slender and tough album".

This Bliss was named the 55th best album of the 2000s by Resident Advisor.

Track listing

References

2007 albums
Pantha du Prince albums